You're Only Mine is a 2014 South Korean morning soap opera broadcast by SBS starring Lee Min-young, Jung Sung-hwan, Song Jae-hee and Han Da-min. It aired from January 5 to July 27, 2014 on Mondays to Fridays at 8:30 a.m. for 148 episodes.

Plot
Eun-jung is the daughter of a widow who once shined shoes for a living. When she becomes involved in a terrible crime committed by her husband Sung-jae and his mother, she loses everything. Against all odds, Eun-jung climbs up the corporate ladder to become a successful shoe designer of a prestigious brand.

Cast

Main characters
Lee Min-young as Go Eun-jung
Jung Sung-hwan as Lee Joon-ha
Song Jae-hee as Kang Sung-jae
Han Da-min as Lee Yoo-ra, Joon-ha's younger sister

Supporting characters
Sunwoo Eun-sook as Na Soon-shim, Eun-jung's mother
Lee Yeon-soo as Na Han-shim, Eun-jung's aunt
Oh Cho-hee as Go Eun-byul, Eun-jung's younger sister and Young-sook's biological daughter
Lee Myung-hoon as Go Eun-shan, Eun-jung's younger brother
Lee Hwi-hyang as Jang Young-sook, Yoo-ra's mother
Lee Dong-joon as Lee Byung-joon, Joon-ha's father
Park Hyung-jun as Lee Joon-hyuk, Joon-ha's older brother, the son of Byung-joon's legal wife
Jung Shi-yeon as Joo Hee-jin, Joon-hyuk's wife
Yoo Hye-ri as Oh Kwang-ja, Sung-jae's mother
Moon Cheon-shik as Oh Kwang-dal, Kwang-ja's younger brother
Yoo So-young as Kang Sung-ah, Sung-jae's younger sister

References

External links
You're Only Mine official SBS website 

Seoul Broadcasting System television dramas
2014 South Korean television series debuts
2014 South Korean television series endings
Korean-language television shows
South Korean romance television series